South Dakota Highway 407 (SD 407) is a  state highway on the southern edge of Oglala Lakota County, South Dakota, United States. Along with Nebraska Highway 87 (N-87), SD 407 serves as a connector route between U.S. Route 20 (US 20) in Rushville, Nebraska and U.S. Route 18 (US 18) in Pine Ridge.

Route description

SD 407 begins at the northern terminus of N-87 (at 790 Road) on the Nebraska–South Dakota border, south of the community of Pine Ridge (a census-designated place [CDP]), and is entirely within the Pine Ridge Indian Reservation. (N-87 continues southerly in Nebraska, through the CDP of White Clay, and on toward its southern terminus at US 20 in Rushville.)

From its southern terminus SD 407 heads north along the eastern edge of, and then into, Pine Ridge. A few blocks after entering the main part of the community SD 407 reaches its northern terminus at an intersection with US 18 and BIA Route 32 (BIA Rd. 32). From the northern terminus of SD 407, US 18 heads easterly to Martin and Mission and northerly to Oglala and Hot Springs. BIA Rd. 32 heads westerly to terminate at BIA Route 41. On average, SD 407 is driven by over 4,200 vehicles per day.

Major intersections

See also

 List of state highways in South Dakota

Notes

References

External links

 The Unofficial South Dakota Highways Page

407
Transportation in Oglala Lakota County, South Dakota
Pine Ridge Indian Reservation